Abdoulaye Harouna Amadou (born 12 December 1992) is a Nigerien basketball player who plays for ABC Fighters and the Niger national team. He played college basketball for Miami RedHawks.

Early life
Born and raised in Niamey, Niger, Harouna was named MVP of the all-star game in Niger two times. He also participated at the Adidas Nations training camp in four years.

Harouna later moved to the United States to play high school basketball for the private boarding school South Kent School.

College career 
Harouna played for the College of Southern Idaho and earned all-region honours; he was named MVP of the Region 18 tournament and helped the Golden Eagles to a 31–3 record and number 3 seed in the NCJAA tournament.

Harouna joined the Miami Redhawks team in 2015, where he wore number 30. He started in 18 games in his rookie season. Harouna redshirted the 2015–16 season.

Professional career
Harouna started his career with AS Nigelec in his home country Niger. In October 2019, Harouna played in the 2020 BAL Qualifying Tournaments with the team. 

In May 2021, he joined Cameroonian club FAP Basketball to play in the inaugural BAL season. Harouna led FAP in scoring with 19.3 points per game and guided his team to the quarterfinals.

Since November 2021, Harouna plays in Morocco with AS Salé of the Division Excellence. He helped them win the Division Excellence title in 2022.

After starting the season in Morocco with Salé, in February 2023, Harouna joined the ABC Fighters for Season 3 of the BAL.

BAL career statistics

|-
| style="text-align:left;"|2021
| style="text-align:left;"|FAP
| 4 || 4 || 28.8 || .310 || .353 || .750 || 4.0 || 2.3 || 1.5 || 0.0 || 19.3
|-
| style="text-align:left;"|2022
| style="text-align:left;"|Salé
| 6 || 6 || 37.4 || .446 || .418 || .636 || 3.7 || 3.5 || 2.2 || 0.3 || 19.8

Personal 
Harouna speaks English, French, Hausa and Zarma.

References

External links
ESPN proifle

1992 births
Living people
AS Salé (basketball) players
Nigerien expatriate sportspeople in Morocco
Nigerien men's basketball players
Miami RedHawks men's basketball players
FAP Basketball players
People from Niamey
ABC Fighters players